The General Service Medal 2008 (GSM 08), was introduced in 2015 for award to Royal Navy, Royal Marines, Army and RAF personnel to recognise specified operations since January 2008, not qualifying for another campaign medal. Unlike its predecessor, the General Service Medal (1962), operations will be denoted by clasps which indicate the geographic area of operations and not a specific operation. The first awards of the medal were made by Secretary of State for Defence Michael Fallon at a ceremony on 12 June 2016.

Appearance

Clasps
The clasps for the medal are named based on the geographic region of operations and not for specific named operations.
The clasps and their qualifying periods of service are as follows:  
Southern Asia 
Operation VERDITER (LEEWAY) (Pakistan), 1 January 2008–6 May 2015 EOD Short Term Training Team 
Arabian Peninsula
Operation QUANTAM, 1 January 2009–21 May 2012
Operation ICENI, 1 June 2012–2 December 2013
Northern Africa
Operation DEFERENCE (Libya), 21 February–22 March 2011 
Operation VOCATE (Libya), 11 November 2011–present
Western Africa
Operation NEWCOMBE (Mali), 13 January–22 May 2013 
Operation NEWCOMBE (Mali), 28 February 2018–present
Eastern Africa
Operation TANGHAM (Somalia) including:
Headquarters Op TANGHAM (01-Nov-13 to present)
Somali National Army (SNA) Training and Advisory Team (STAT); formerly included in Op BACKWELL (24-Apr-12 to present).
African Union Mission in Somalia (AMISOM) Mission Support Team (MST); formerly included in Op BACKWELL (24-Apr-12 to present). 
United Nations Support Team (UNST); formerly Op CATAN (03-Mar-16 to present). 
Comprehensive Approach to Security (CAS) Strand 2A; formerly Op PRESIDIUM. 
Government Provided Personnel to UN; formerly Op PRAISER (16-Dec-14 to present).
European Union Training Mission-Somalia (EUTM-S); formally Op MODEST (24-Jan-13 to 01-Feb-20).
Gulf of Aden 
Task Force 50, October–November 2016 

Service in a second or subsequent qualifying operation is reflected by an additional clasp added to the existing GSM medal, not by a second medal. 

It is expected that further operations and clasps will be added to the GSM as time progresses.

Notes

References

British campaign medals